Oriol Riera Magem (Catalan pronunciation: [uˈɾjɔl ˈrjeɾə]; born 3 July 1986) is a Spanish retired footballer who played as a striker, currently manager of CD Tudelano.

After starting out at Barcelona, he went on to amass La Liga totals of 102 matches and 23 goals over four seasons, with Osasuna and Deportivo. He added 148 games and 31 goals in the Segunda División for four clubs, and also competed professionally in England and Australia in a 16-year career.

Club career

Barcelona
Born in Vic, Barcelona, Catalonia, Riera played youth football with FC Barcelona, but spent the vast majority of his tenure with the club in representation of the C and B teams. His official input with the main squad consisted of 13 minutes in a 4–0 away win against Ciudad de Murcia in the round of 32 of the Copa del Rey – when he was still a junior – on 17 December 2003.

Journeyman
After leaving the Camp Nou, Riera resumed his career in the Segunda División B, where he played with Cultural y Deportiva Leonesa and Celta de Vigo B. He appeared in five Segunda División matches with the latter's main squad, four as a starter.

Riera competed in the second tier from 2009 to 2013, with Córdoba CF and AD Alcorcón. He scored 18 goals in his second year with the latter side, (including a hat-trick in a 3–1 victory at UD Las Palmas on 8 September 2012), helping them to the promotion play-offs.

Osasuna
On 5 July 2013, Riera signed for three seasons with CA Osasuna. He made his La Liga debut on 18 August, coming on as a second-half substitute in a 1–2 home loss to Granada CF. His first goal in the competition came on 20 September of the same year, in a 2–1 win over Elche CF also at the El Sadar Stadium.

Wigan Athletic
On 28 June 2014, after Osasuna's relegation, Riera agreed to a three-year deal with Wigan Athletic of the Football League Championship, for a reported £2 million fee. He scored his first goal for his new team on 23 August, the only against Blackpool in a 1–0 victory at the DW Stadium.

Deportivo
Riera returned to his country's top division on 7 January 2015, signing on loan to Deportivo de La Coruña until the end of the season. On 30 June he agreed to a permanent deal at the Estadio Riazor, having narrowly avoided relegation.

On 12 August 2016, Riera returned to his former club Osasuna after agreeing to a one-year loan deal. He scored his first goal for them on 10 September, but in a 5–2 away loss to Real Madrid. He netted another in the 3–3 home draw with Valencia CF (adding an own goal), in a relegation-ending campaign.

Western Sydney Wanderers
In July 2017, aged 31, Riera cut ties with Deportivo and joined A-League side Western Sydney Wanderers FC as a marquee player shortly after. He scored 15 times in his first season, but his team could only finish seventh.

In April 2019, the club confirmed that Riera was not renewing his contract.

Fuenlabrada
On 25 July 2019, free agent Riera agreed to a one-year contract with second division newcomers CF Fuenlabrada. On 10 August of the following year, after just one goal in 35 competitive appearances, he announced his retirement at the age of 34 and the desire to remain associated to the sport as manager. In October, he was named assistant coach of Alcorcón's reserves.

International career
Riera played his first match for the representative Catalan national team on 30 December 2013, scoring the last goal in a 4–1 win over Cape Verde at the Estadi Olímpic Lluís Companys.

Career statistics

References

External links

1986 births
Living people
Footballers from Vic
Spanish footballers
Association football forwards
La Liga players
Segunda División players
Segunda División B players
Tercera División players
FC Barcelona C players
FC Barcelona Atlètic players
FC Barcelona players
Cultural Leonesa footballers
RC Celta de Vigo players
Córdoba CF players
AD Alcorcón footballers
CA Osasuna players
Deportivo de La Coruña players
CF Fuenlabrada footballers
English Football League players
Wigan Athletic F.C. players
A-League Men players
Western Sydney Wanderers FC players
Marquee players (A-League Men)
Catalonia international footballers
Spanish expatriate footballers
Expatriate footballers in England
Expatriate soccer players in Australia
Spanish expatriate sportspeople in England
Spanish expatriate sportspeople in Australia
Spanish football managers
Segunda Federación managers